S. Madhavan was an Indian politician and former Member of the Legislative Assembly of Tamil Nadu. He was elected to the Tamil Nadu legislative assembly as a Dravida Munnetra Kazhagam candidate from the Thirukoshtiyur constituency in the 1962 election, from the Tiruppattur constituency in 1967 and 1971, and as an Anna Dravida Munnetra Kazhagam candidate in 1984 election.

Early life and career
Madhavan was born in Singampunari of Sivagangai district. He started his career as a lawyer, appearing for many DMK leaders in the 1950s. Eventually, he was attracted to the Dravidian movement and associated himself with Dravida Munnetra Kazhzagam. He got elected to the State Assembly from the Thirukoshtiyur constituency in 1962. After getting elected to the Assembly from Tirupattur constituency in the 1967 elections, he joined the cabinet headed by DMK founder leader C.N. Annadurai and served as Law Minister. Madhavan again got elected from the same constituency in the 1971 elections and held important portfolios in the Karunanidhi cabinet. In a short period the veteran leader served in the cabinets headed by late C.N. Annadurai and M. Karunanidhi.

Following a split in DMK he joined the AIADMK, accepting the leadership of late M.G. Ramachandran. He got elected to the Assembly in 1984 elections from Tirupattur as an AIADMK nominee. Later, he threw his lot with Jayalalithaa and became the treasurer of the party before lying low in politics. Madhavan had also been a Rajya Saba member from 1990 to 1996.

He had a cordial relationship with other party leaders in his constituency and in Tamil Nadu in general. Several political articles were periodically penned by him in leading newspapers such as The Hindu, Dinamani and Murasoli.

Death
He died at the age of 85 due to age related illness on 3 April 2018 at his residence in Singampunari. He is survived by his wife, two daughters and a son. Following his passing, M.K. Stalin, AICC general secretary Thirunavukarasar, several former ministers, and prominent industrialists across Tamil Nadu paid tribute to Madhavan.

References 

Dravida Munnetra Kazhagam politicians
Tamil Nadu MLAs 1985–1989
1933 births
2018 deaths